The Bus Songs is a compilation album from American country music artist Toby Keith. The album was announced July 14, 2017, and was released September 8, 2017. It is a combination of new and older songs written by Keith. The album contains twelve songs: two new, five re-recorded, and five previously released songs. The new songs on the album are "Shitty Golfer" and "Wacky Tobaccy". The songs "Runnin' Block", "Hell No", "The Critic", "Ballad of Balad", and "Weed With Willie" have been re-recorded and are referred to as "fresh takes on old favorites" by Rolling Stone magazine.

Background
According to CMT News, the album gets its title from the late night recording sessions Keith has had on his tour bus. The album has been said to be focused more towards the adult fans of Keith and not likely to be broadcast on mainstream radio due to the "adult humor, drinking and self-deprecation" present within the songs included in the album.

The album was announced on July 14, 2017. Prior to the announcement of the album, on June 23, 2017, Toby released the music video of the track "Wacky Tobaccy" – a song about cannabis – on his YouTube channel. The music video for "Wacky Tobaccy" was filmed on Keith's tour bus and contained a cameo appearance of Willie Nelson smoking cannabis. Rolling Stone called the music video "suitably silly," containing video of a jam session in Toby's tour bus "surrounded by posters of Jamaica and smoky looking graphics." On October 19, 2017 a promotional video for "Shitty Golfer" was added to Keith's official Vevo account.

Commercial performance
The album debuted at No. 6 on Top Country Albums, which is Keith's 23rd Top 10 album on the chart, with 12,000 copies sold. It sold a further 3,600 copies the following week. It has sold 29,700 copies in the United States as of January 2018.

Track listing

"Brand New Bow", "Hell No", and the original version of "Runnin' Block" appeared on the 2006 album White Trash with Money.
"Call a Marine" appeared on the deluxe edition of the 2013 album Drinks After Work.
The original version of "The Critic" and the original version of "Weed with Willie" appeared on the 2003 album Shock'n Y'all.
"The Size I Wear" appeared on the 2012 album Hope on the Rocks.
"Ballad of Balad" appeared on the 2009 album American Ride.
"Rum Is the Reason" appeared on the 2015 album 35 MPH Town. 
The original studio version of "Get Out of My Car" appeared on the 2010 album Bullets in the Gun, the live version appeared on the deluxe edition of Hope on the Rocks.

Personnel
The following musicians performed on the album:
Greg Barnhill – background vocals
Josh Bertrand – pedal steel guitar
Bruce Bouton – pedal steel guitar
Carl Murr – trombone
Dave Cohen – accordion, Hammond B-3 organ, piano, Wurlitzer
Perry Coleman – background vocals
J.T. Corenflos – electric guitar
Chad Cromwell – drums
Eric Darken – percussion
Roman Dudok – saxophone
Rich Eckhardt – electric guitar, background vocals 
Scotty Emerick – acoustic guitar, finger snaps, background vocals
Joey Floyd – acoustic guitar, background vocals
Chuck Goff - bass guitar
Dink Cook – bass guitar
Kevin "Swine" Grantt – bass guitar
Kenny Greenberg – electric guitar
Robert Greenidge – steel drums
Doyle Grisham – pedal steel guitar
Roger Guth – drums
Rob Hajacos – fiddle
Aubrey Haynie – fiddle
The Hogliners – background vocals
Jay Jennings – trumpet
Charlie Judge – Hammond B-3 organ, Wurlitzer 
Toby Keith – acoustic guitar, lead vocals
Mills Logan – programming
Brent Mason – electric guitar
Rex Mauney – piano, background vocals
Jim Mayer – bass guitar
Dave McAfee – drums
Mac McAnally – acoustic guitar, background vocals
Chris McHugh – drums
Rob McNelley – electric guitar
Miles McPherson – drums
Steve Nathan – Hammond B-3 organ, piano, Wurlitzer 
Russ Pahl – Dobro, pedal steel guitar
Bobby Pinson – background vocals
Lucy Pinson – background vocals, backflips
Danny Rader – acoustic guitar
Mica Roberts – background vocals
David Santos – bass guitar
Randy Scruggs – banjo
Steve Sheehan – acoustic guitar
Jimmie Lee Sloas – bass guitar
Bobby Terry – acoustic guitar
The TKokies – background vocals
Ilya Toshinsky – acoustic guitar

Charts

References

2017 albums
Toby Keith albums
Show Dog-Universal Music albums
Albums produced by Toby Keith